Chris Foggin (born 15 September 1985 in Sunderland) is an English film director and screenwriter.

Biography and career
Foggin was born in Sunderland, Tyne and Wear. He studied media and film at Northumbria University in Newcastle.

While he was working in a sandwich shop, an acquaintance put him up for a job as an assistant floor runner on an ITV drama called Place of Execution. In 2010 he was promoted to assistant director in film and television. He has worked behind the scenes on several movies such as My Week with Marilyn, Jane Eyre, The Double and The Iron Lady.

Foggin started directing in 2011 with three short films, the most known of which is Friend Request Pending starring Judi Dench and Tom Hiddleston. The film was in the official selection of the 55th BFI London Film Festival and received various recognitions. Foggin's first low-budget feature, Kids in Love, with Will Poulter, Alma Jodorowsky and Cara Delevingne, was shot for Ealing Studios in 2013.

In 2014, Screen International named Foggin as one of the UK Stars of Tomorrow.

Filmography

Awards

References

External links
 

1985 births
Living people
English film directors
English screenwriters
English male screenwriters